Events in the year 1989 in Norway.

Incumbents
 Monarch – Olav V
 Prime Minister – Gro Harlem Brundtland (Labour Party) until 16 October, Jan P. Syse (Conservative Party)

Events

 30 March – The Oseberg oil field and the first gas pipeline to mainland Norway were opened.
 1 June – Pope John Paul II visited Norway for the first time. This was the first time a pope has ever visited Norway.
 9 May – the ban on Skateboarding in Norway, which was in act since 1978, is removed.
 7 July – The opening of the Atlanterhavsveien Road.
 8 September – A Norwegian passenger plane crashed outside Hirtshals. All the 55 on board died.
 11 September – The 1989 Parliamentary election takes place.
 9 October – The opening of the Sami Parliament of Norway.
 16 October – Gro Harlem Brundtland resigns, with her cabinet, as Prime Minister of Norway for the second time.
 16 October – Syse's Cabinet was appointed.

Popular culture

Sports

3 November – Torgeir Bryn becomes the first Norwegian to play in the NBA, when he played 2 minutes for the Los Angeles Clippers against Houston Rockets.

Music

Film

Literature
Dag Solstad is awarded the Nordic Council Literature Prize, for Roman 1987.

Notable births

1 January – Marianne Haukland, politician.
29 January – Marita Skammelsrud Lund, Norwegian footballer
2 February – Nils Kristen Sandtrøen, politician.
10 February – Birgit Skarstein, competitive rower and cross-country skier.
19 February – Torbjørn Vereide, politician.
1 March – Espen Lie Hansen, handball player.
8 March – Emily Stang Sando, handball player.
14 May – Petter Kristiansen, singer and songwriter.
18 November – Christoffer Rambo, handball player.

Notable deaths
9 January – Øivind Jensen, boxer (born 1905)
10 January – Kai Fjell, painter, printmaker and scenographer (born 1907)
11 January – Thor Myklebust, politician (born 1908)
4 February  – Johanne Reutz Gjermoe, economist and politician (born 1896).
19 February – Sigurd Marius Johansen, politician (born 1906)
2 March – Claus Egil Feyling, politician (born 1916)
7 April – Per Hysing-Dahl, politician (born 1920)
7 May – Anton Rønneberg, writer, theatre critic, dramaturg and theatre director (born 1902)
17 May – Hallvard Eika, politician and Minister (born 1920)
25 May – Arne Selberg, bridge engineer (born 1910).
23 June – Arne Tuft, cross country skier (born 1911)
5 August – John Larsen, rifle shooter, Olympic gold medallist and World Champion (born 1913)
12 August – Lillebil Ibsen, dancer and actress (born 1899)
25 August – Hans Børli, poet and writer (born 1918)
16 October – Hans Frette, politician (born 1927)
22 October – Bjarne Daniel Solli, politician (born 1910)
28 October – Johannes Lislerud, politician (born 1911)
30 November – Ingeborg Refling Hagen, author and teacher (born 1895)
9 December – Gunnar Bøe, economist and politician (born 1917)
30 December – Gunn Vigdis Olsen-Hagen, politician (born 1946)

Full date unknown
Rolf Hauge, army officer (born 1915)
Andreas Holmsen, professor and historian (born 1906)
Leif Iversen, politician (born 1911)
Paulus Svendsen, historian of literature and ideas (born 1904)

See also

References

External links